Heilongjiang International University, formerly known as Star College of Harbin Normal University is a university located in Harbin, Heilongjiang, China.

Heilongjiang International University is situated in Jiangbei, north of the city centre. It developed from a small language college but now has expanded to close to 12,000 students. It offers a range of majors including Business, English, Chinese, Art and Modern Technology. Unique part of the university is the large number of foreign teachers who are typically a cosmopolitan bunch from many different countries.

Heilongjiang International University has a special affiliation with the London Southbank University.

See also
List of universities in China

References

External links
Chinese homepage 

Universities and colleges in Heilongjiang
Universities and colleges in Harbin